Julien is an unincorporated community in Christian, Kentucky, United States.

History
Julien had its start when the railroad was extended to that point. A post office called Julian was established in 1888, and remained in operation until 1909.

References

Unincorporated communities in Christian County, Kentucky
Unincorporated communities in Kentucky